The Leading Ladies was a British-American girl group/supergroup formed in London, England in 2017. The group consists of three leading women from the London West End stage; American singer and actress Amber Riley, who starred in Dreamgirls, British soul singer Beverley Knight, who featured in The Bodyguard, Memphis and Cats and British theatre star Cassidy Janson, who took the leading role in Beautiful: The Carole King Musical.

Formation

The idea for forming Leading Ladies came after Beverley Knight was approached by her label East West to record a musicals themed album. She was not sold on the idea of recording a solo album of show songs and turned down the idea. Knight subsequently formed Leading Ladies as she wanted to try something new after having a health scare, which resulted in her having a hysterectomy. After watching both Riley promoting Dreamgirls on The Graham Norton Show and Janson performing in Beautiful: The Carole King Musical, Knight asked East West to approach both women with the offer of recording an album together. Riley and Janson both agreed and the group was formed and signed to East West/Warner Music.

Debut album: Songs from the Stage

The Leading Ladies' debut album Songs from the Stage was released on 17 November 2017. The album features fourteen songs from musicals including Hamilton, Cats, Rent, Dreamgirls, Funny Girl, The Bodyguard, Memphis and Beautiful: The Carole King Musical. Songs from the Stage was produced by Grammy Award-winning British producer Brian Rawling, who has previously worked with Cher, Tina Turner and Lionel Richie. The setting-up of the music and vocal arrangements were done together as a group, while most of the recording occurred separately within a two-week period due to their busy individual schedules. During the album recording, Riley and Janson were still both contracted to perform in the West End, while Knight was recovering from surgery and due to go on her I Love Soulsville UK tour.

"One Night Only" (originally from the musical Dreamgirls) was released as the group's debut single on 6 October 2017. The song peaked on the A-list at BBC Radio 2. "Songs from the Stage" debuted within the top 20 of the UK Albums Chart and the Scottish Albums Chart.

The group promoted the album by performing the track "Wind Beneath My Wings" on BBC Children in Need and "I'm Every Woman" on Strictly Come Dancing. The second single from the album was revealed on 27 November 2017 to be a double A-side single of "I'm Every Woman" from The Bodyguard and "Have Yourself a Merry Little Christmas" from Meet Me in St. Louis.

Since the release of Songs From the Stage, there have been no further projects from the group.

Members
Amber Riley (2017-2018)
Beverley Knight (2017-2018)
Cassidy Janson (2017-2018)

Discography
The discography of the British-American girl group Leading Ladies consists of one studio album and two singles.

Studio albums

Singles

Promotional singles

Awards and nominations

References

External links

Official Site

Pop music supergroups
British supergroups
English pop music groups
English girl groups
British pop girl groups
Vocal trios
English vocal groups
American musical theatre actresses
British musical theatre actresses
English musical theatre actresses
Musical groups established in 2017
2017 establishments in England
Musical groups disestablished in 2018
2018 disestablishments in England